José Carlos de Lima (23 February 1955 – 30 January 1988) was a Brazilian cyclist. He competed in the individual road race and team pursuit events at the 1980 Summer Olympics.

References

External links
 

1955 births
1988 deaths
Brazilian male cyclists
Brazilian road racing cyclists
Brazilian track cyclists
Olympic cyclists of Brazil
Cyclists at the 1980 Summer Olympics
20th-century Brazilian people